AIDS is a peer-reviewed scientific journal that is published by Lippincott Williams & Wilkins. It was established in 1987 and is an official journal of the International AIDS Society. It covers all aspects of HIV and AIDS, including basic science, clinical trials, epidemiology, and social science. The editor in chief is Jay A. Levy. Eighteen issues are published annually.

Abstracting and indexing
The journal is abstracted and indexed in Chemical Abstracts Service, EMBASE, Index Medicus, MEDLINE, and the Science Citation Index Expanded. According to the Journal Citation Reports, the journal has a 2021 impact factor of 4.632.

See also
 'Journal of Acquired Immune Deficiency Syndromes''

References

External links

HIV/AIDS journals
Delayed open access journals
Publications established in 1987
Immunology journals
English-language journals
Lippincott Williams & Wilkins academic journals
Academic journals associated with international learned and professional societies
Journals published between 13 and 25 times per year